Dixon is a census-designated place (CDP) in Sanders County, Montana, United States. The population was 216 at the 2000 census.

The town is named for Joseph M. Dixon, a Montana politician. The town sits adjacent to the lower Flathead River near the Bison Range.

Geography
Dixon is located at  (47.311611, -114.340983).

Demographics

At the 2000 census, there were 216 people, 89 households and 54 families residing in the CDP. The population density was 32.5 per square mile (12.6/km). There were 93 housing units at an average density of 14.0 per square mile (5.4/km). The racial makeup of the CDP was 75.46% White, 20.37% Native American, and 4.17% from two or more races. Hispanic or Latino of any race were 1.39% of the population.

There were 89 households, of which 29.2% had children under the age of 18 living with them, 46.1% were married couples living together, 7.9% had a female householder with no husband present, and 39.3% were non-families. 31.5% of all households were made up of individuals, and 15.7% had someone living alone who was 65 years of age or older. The average household size was 2.43 and the average family size was 3.07.

25.9% of the population were under the age of 18, 7.4% from 18 to 24, 20.4% from 25 to 44, 27.8% from 45 to 64, and 18.5% who were 65 years of age or older. The median age was 42 years. For every 100 females, there were 94.6 males. For every 100 females age 18 and over, there were 102.5 males.

The median household income was $15,455 and the family median income was $23,750. Males had a median income of $28,750 and females $16,250. The per capita income was $11,379. About 19.6% of families and 35.9% of the population were below the poverty line, including 45.5% of those under the age of eighteen and 22.2% of those 65 or over.

According to the most recent demographics data available from the Census Bureau released in December 2018, Figure 1 Dixon illustrates it has 203 population.

Of the 203 people living in Dixon, Montana, 95 are Men and 108 are Women, with the median age being 44. The total number of occupied homes in Dixon is 83, with 53 of them being Family led homes.

References

Census-designated places in Sanders County, Montana
Census-designated places in Montana